The Mapuche conflict involves indigenous Mapuche communities located in Araucanía and nearby regions of Chile and Argentina. It is often referred to as a conflict between the Mapuche and the Chilean government or state. Big forestry companies and their contractors, Chilean police and some non-indigenous landowners have been confronted by militant Mapuche organizations and local Mapuche communities in the context of the conflict. Some scholars argue the conflict is an indigenous self-determination conflict, others like Francisco Huenchumilla see it as the expression of a wider political conflict that affects all of Chile given the existence of other indigenous groups.

Mapuche activists demand greater autonomy, recognition of rights, and the return of historical lands. The Mapuche conflict intensified following the return of democracy in the 1990s, with Mapuche activists seeking to rectify the loss of ancestral territory during the Occupation of the Araucanía and the Conquest of the Desert. The Mapuche lack a central organization and individuals and communities carry out their struggle independently and by different means. Some groups, such as the Coordinadora Arauco-Malleco (CAM), have used violent tactics since 1998, while other groups have preferred non-violent tactics and institutional negotiations. Violent activists have been scrutinized for their finances and international links, with some being accused of large-scale theft of wood, either by performing the theft themselves or taking possession of stolen wood. Others have been linked to drug trafficking. Personnel of Coordinadora Arauco-Malleco has been in Venezuela meeting high-ranking officials of the Nicolás Maduro government, and there are claims of training with FARC guerrillas in Colombia.

The handling of the conflict by Chilean authorities has been the subject of controversy and political debate. The label of "terrorism" by authorities have been controversial as well as the killing of unarmed Mapuches by police followed by failed cover-ups. Another point of contest is the "militarization of Araucanía", yet the use of military-grade long gun against police vehicles has been cited as explaining the need for armoured vehicles. There are recurrent claims of Mapuche "political prisoners".

The conflict has received the attention of international human rights organizations such as Amnesty International, which have criticized the Chilean government's treatment of the Mapuche. Many activists have been killed. Mapuche police and Mapuche contractors have also been killed by violent activists. Recently, the MACEDA database has compiled more than 2,600 events related to this conflict (1990-2016).

The area where the conflict has been most violent is known as "Zona Roja" (lit. Red Zone) and lies in the provinces of Arauco and Malleco.

Background

The conflict has its historical roots in the occupation of Araucania by the Chilean Army in the late 19th century. After 1881 the land was divided into plots and distributed mostly among private owners (including foreign and Chilean settlers as well as members of the army). The Mapuche (around 100,000 persons according to the 1907 Census) were confined to almost 3,000 atomized reservations named titulos de merced. Since the 1960s, many Mapuche were actively involved in the Chilean land reform. More than 150,000 hectares of land were transferred to the communities, but most of this land was later taken back during the counter-agrarian reform process implemented during the military dictatorship (1973–1990). From the 1980s onward, large swathes of southern Chile became integrated into the country's export economy, forming what has been described as an enclave economy. The central component of this is the forestry sector, with several plantations in plots that were originally part of the land reform and others in plots claimed by communities.

The Mapuche conflict surfaced in the 1990s following the return of democracy. The conflict started in areas inhabited mostly by Mapuches like the vicinities of Purén, where some indigenous communities have been demanding that certain lands they claim for their own but which are now the property of logging and farming companies and individuals be turned over to them. 
Several Mapuche organizations are demanding the right of self-recognition in the quality of Indigenous peoples, as recognized under the Declaration on the Rights of Indigenous Peoples by the General Assembly of the United Nations.

The official 2002 Chilean census found 609,000 Chileans identifying as Mapuches. The same survey determined that 35 percent of the nation's Mapuches think the biggest issue for the government to resolve relates to their ancestral properties. The official 2012 Chilean census found the number of Mapuches in Chile to be 1,508,722 and the 2017 census a total of 1,745,147, representing around 10% of the population.

Some scholars and studies have found correlations and proposed links with centuries-old events. A 2021 study found that the geographical distribution of incidents correlated better with archaeological sites than with forest plantations, schools or Mapuche communities. Historian José Bengoa has likened the Mapuche conflict to the Catalan struggle taking note that both conflicts were major concerns for the 17th century Spanish Empire and remain unresolved to the day. More generally, it is possible to classify this as an indigenous self-determination conflict.

1990–2015
One of the first organizations claiming self-determination in the early 1990s was the Consejo de Todas las Tierras (CTT), which coordinated a new wave of, mostly pacific, plot occupations and started using the Wenufoye Mapuche flag. The conflict became more violent around 1998, with the first arson attacks in Lumaco and the creation of the more radical Coordinadora Arauco-Malleco (CAM) group.

1996–2004: Ralco controversy
The building of the Ralco Hydroelectric Plant, Chile's largest hydroelectric power plant, in the 1990s was highly controversial among Mapuches and pro-Mapuche groups because its reservoir would flood sacred land including one Mapuche cemetery. After compensations were paid, the plant was eventually finished in 2004. In December of 2016, the body of Nicolasa Quintremán, a 73 year old Mapuche leader who had opposed plant construction, was found floating in the reservoir.

2009 incidents

Numerous incidents such as violent land occupations, burning of private property and demonstrations have occurred in Araucania. In the wake of the deaths of a few of its activists, Mapuche organization Coordinadora Arauco-Malleco played a key role by organizing and supporting violent land occupations and other direct actions, such as the burning of houses and farms, that have ended up in clashes with the police. 

The government of Michelle Bachelet said that it was not ready to contemplate expropriating land in the southern region of Araucania to restore lost ancestral territory to the Mapuche. The government set out to buy land for use by 115 Mapuche communities, however, according to government officials, the current owners had nearly tripled the prices they were demanding. On the other hand, the effectiveness of the government policy of buying and distributing land has been questioned.
Two special presidential envoys were sent to southern Chile to review the increasingly fractious "Mapuche situation".

2010 hunger strike

 Between 2010 and 2011, a series of hunger strikes by Mapuche community members imprisoned in Chilean prisons to protest against the conditions in which the proceedings against them took place, mainly due to the application of the antiterrorist law, and for the double prosecutions they were subject to, because parallel proceedings were carried out in the ordinary and military courts.
The strikes began on 12 July 2010, with a group that was in preventive detention, some for more than one year and a half, all accused of violating anti-terrorism legislation.

January 2013 events 
A march was held in commemoration of the death of Matías Catrileo in Santiago in January 2013. During the march a group of masked men attacked banks and threw molotov cocktails. Later the same group caused incidents near Estación Mapocho. The commemoration was associated by newspaper La Tercera with the assault and torching of a truck in Chile Route 5 in Araucanía Region.

In the morning of 4 January 2013 the agricultural business couple Luchsinger-Mackay died in a fire in their house in Vilcún, Araucanía Region. The prosecutor said it was arson in a preliminary report and newspaper La Tercera linked it to the commemoration of the death of Matías Catrileo and to the truck burning the previous days. A relative of the dead persons claimed there was a campaign to empty the region of farmers and businessmen adding that "the guerrilla is winning" and lamented the "lack of rule of law". A male activist wounded by a bullet was detained by police 600 m from the torched house. A thesis claims the house was attacked by at least seven persons and that the "machi" had received the bullet wound from the occupants of the house before dying in the fire.

On 30 April a freight train was derailed near Collipulli to be then assaulted by men with firearms. Interior minister Andrés Chadwick said the Chilean Antiterrorist Law will be applied to those responsible for the attack.

2016–2022: Upsurge of the conflict
Since 2016, there has been an increasing number of attacks in the region, especially against churches, machinery, forest industries, and security forces. A June 2018 article in the equaltimes.org website reported that "military police (GOPE) often intervene violently, on the side of the companies, intimidating the Mapuche communities, acting indiscriminately against women or minors." The Jesuit priest Carlos Bresciani, who has spent 15 years heading the Misión Jesuita Mapuche in Tirúa, said that he doesn't see autonomy coming easily, given the disposition of the Chilean Senate, and that the "underlying problem is how communities participate in decision-making in their own territories". Bresciani observed that the violence "reflects that there is an open wound." In January 2018, while saying Mass before thousands at Temuco, "the de facto capital of the Mapuche community", Pope Francis called for an end to the violence, and for solidarity with "those who daily bear the burden of those many injustices". In 2018, Camilo Catrillanca, the grandson of a local Indigenous leader, was shot in the head during a police operation in a rural community near the town of Ercilla. His death triggered nationwide protest leading to seven police officers being convicted in connection with the shooting.

On 20 December 2019, the UN urged Switzerland to stop deportation of Mapuche activist Flor Calfunao to Chile because of concern for her human rights, including the risk of torture.

On 16 June 2021, a police officer was wounded during clashes with suspected indigenous militia groups in the Biobío region. In the same region volunteer firefighters were caught in crossfire between police forces and indigenous militiamen while trying to get to the La Pasión farm to put out a fire.

On 6 July 2021, protest erupted during the opening constitutional session, with citizens demanding an amnesty law for supposed political prisoners who had been arrested during the country's political unrest in 2019.

In late July, fighting was reported between state forces and suspected indigenous militias in the Araucanía and Biobío regions. In the Biobío commune of Tirua, armed men ambushed a police unit, injuring two police officers. Finally, in the Araucanía city of Carahue, militiamen exchanged fire with police officers carrying out a protective order outside the building of a logging company. Two police officers and a worker were injured, before the suspects escaped.

In October, Chilean President Sebastián Piñera declared a state of emergency and deployed troops to Biobio and Araucania in response to clashes between security forces and Mapuche groups.

On 25 December 2021, the Mapuche organization Lafkenche Mapuche Resistance claimed responsibility for the following sabotage actions in Wallmapu in support of Mapuche political prisoners and fallen fighters:

 Wednesday 24 November: Burning of four trucks for extracting aggregate material from the Trongol river, and a forestry truck belonging to Bosques Arauco, in the Sector Los Rios, Los Alamos.
 Thursday 9 December: Burning of 15 forestry machines, in the Coihue-Yeneco Estate of Forestal Arauco. Lebu.
 Tuesday 14 December: Burning of 15 forestry machines in the El Tesero Estate of Forestal Arauco. Curanilahue.
 Tuesday 22 December: Burning of 31 summer cabins in the Sector Lincuyin. Contulmo.

Anti-terrorism Law
The Chilean government's usage of the "Anti-Terrorism Law" in the conflict is a focal point of the controversy surrounding the conflict. In 2013, the United Nations condemned the use of the Anti-Terrorism Law against Mapuche activists. Amnesty International and the Inter-American Court of Human Rights have made similar criticisms.

According to a May 2022 poll by Cadem 76% of Chileans believe there is terrorism in Araucanía Region. This is a rise from the 56% that believed so in 2017. Conversely, Cadem polls show that those who reject the notion that there is terrorism in Araucanía Region decreased from 41% to 19% in the same period.

Notes

See also
Indigenous peoples in Chile
Indigenous peoples in Argentina
Resistencia Ancestral Mapuche

References

 
1990s conflicts
2000s conflicts
2010s conflicts
2020s conflicts
Indigenous peoples in Chile
History of Patagonia
Argentina–Chile relations